Rino Ferrario (7 December 1926 – 19 September 2012) was an Italian footballer who played as a midfielder.

Club career
As a defensive midfielder, Ferrario became a starter at Juventus, winning the position from Carlo Parola. At Juventus, he won two Serie A championships, the first in 1952 and the other in 1958 as well as one Coppa Italia before ending his career with cross-city rivals Torino at thirty-five years of age.

International career
Ferrario was one of five players selected to represent the Italian national team at the 1954 World Cup that did not play during the cup (among others; Sergio Cervato, Leonardo Costagliola, Guido Gratton and, Gino Pivatelli). A notable instance with the national team at Budapest was Ferrario's confrontation with Hungary's local hero Kocsis in a 1955 game where Italy lost 2–0 that nearly started a riot between the Italians and Magyars. For the 'Azzurri' he earned 10 caps between 1952 and 1958 and was praised for his consistent performances. He was also a member of the Italian team that took part at the 1952 Summer Olympics, however he did not participate in any matches.

Style of play
Nicknamed 'Mobilia' for his rugby player-like physique (he was one of the biggest players to ever play on the Italian national team at the time), Ferrario was a powerful, dominant, and tenacious defensive midfielder, who was almost impossible to knock down, and difficult to get by. He was known for his competitive spirit, work-rate, and stamina, which enabled him to cover the pitch efficiently and win back possession. A decisive and consistent player, he would be frequently involved in crucial plays for his team. He was called "The Belfast Lion" for fiercely defending himself in Belfast during a pitch invasion by angry opposing fans.

References

External links
 La Gazzetta dello Sport
 https://kripkit.com/rino-ferrario/

1926 births
2012 deaths
Italian footballers
Association football midfielders
S.S. Arezzo players
S.S.D. Lucchese 1905 players
Juventus F.C. players
Inter Milan players
U.S. Triestina Calcio 1918 players
Torino F.C. players
Serie A players
Italy international footballers
1954 FIFA World Cup players